Oberried Estate ( or ) is an estate in the municipality of Belp in the canton of Bern in Switzerland.  It is a Swiss heritage site of national significance.

History
Oberried was built in 1735-6 in the Rococo style for Victor von Fischer (1709-1750), a grandson of the founder of the Fischerpost postal service.  The von Fischer (also von Reichenbach) family first appear in Bern in the 13th century.  While they held many offices in the city, they only became truly wealthy after Beat Fischer founded his postal business.  Victor's son, Gottlieb Fischer, expanded the estate, building a large ballroom and adding extensive gardens around the house.  He added a Gloriette in the garden, the only one in the Canton of Bern.  In 1853 the family sold the estate and it passed through numerous owners until the Familie von Fischer Foundation acquired it.  In 2000-01 the building was renovated and now hosts cultural events such as concerts, readings, theater and dance recitals.

See also
 List of castles in Switzerland

References

External links
 
 Oberried website

Cultural property of national significance in the canton of Bern
Castles in the Canton of Bern